The Coffee Sand is a geologic formation in Tennessee. It preserves fossils dating back to the Cretaceous period. It preserved indeterminate hadrosauroids including a possible adult Eotrachodon.

See also
 List of fossiliferous stratigraphic units in Tennessee
 Paleontology in Tennessee

References

 

Cretaceous geology of Tennessee
Cretaceous Mississippi